Chris Haines (born May 16, 1951) is an American cross-country skier. He competed in the men's 30 kilometre event at the 1976 Winter Olympics.

References

1951 births
Living people
American male cross-country skiers
Olympic cross-country skiers of the United States
Cross-country skiers at the 1976 Winter Olympics
People from Pullman, Washington